Sakuntalai is a 1940 Indian Tamil-language film directed by Ellis R. Dungan and starring M. S. Subbulakshmi and G. N. Balasubramaniam.

Plot 
Sakuntalai is the story of the mythological queen Shakuntala, whose tale is told in the Mahabharata and dramatised by Kalidasa in the play Abhijñānaśākuntalam.

Cast 

Male cast
G. N. Balasubramaniam  as Dushyanta
Serukalathur Sama as Kanwa
S. R. Kalyanasundaram as Saradwata
T. P. S. Mani as Durvasa
K. Sarangapani as Madhavya
N. S. Krishnan and T,S.Durairaj as Fishermen
P. G. Venkatesan as Cartman

Female cast
M. S. Subbulakshmi as Sakuntalai
Radha as Bharata
T. A. Mathuram as Priyamvada
Sakuntala Bai as Anasuya
Golden Saradambal as Gouthami
M. S. Ramani as Sarangrava
K. Thavamani Devi as Menaka

Production 
Subbulakshmi and her husband T. Sadasivam formed Royal Talkies to produce their own films. They decided to make a movie based Shakuntala's life and asked director K. Subramanyam, to direct the film. Subramaniam was not able to do so because of prior commitments and recommended Ellis Dungan to be hired instead. Sadasivam wrote the screenplay and Papanasam Sivan was hired to write the lyrics. Carnatic singer G. N. Balasubramaniam was cast as King Dushyanta. The comedic duo of N. S. Krishnan – T. A. Mathuram were also among the cast. Dungan introduced several new techniques to Tamil cinema in this film. The scene where Shakuntala loses her ring was shot in slow motion through a glass tank filled with water. In his autobiography (A Guide to Adventure: An Autobiography, Dorrance Publishing Company (2002)), Dungan wrote the following about his use of a European dancer for adding glamour to the film :

The completed film was 17,400 Feet in length (around 3 hours run time). The film advanced the popularity of singing lead actress M. S. Subbulakshmi.

Soundtrack 

The music was composed by Thuraiyur Rajagopala Sarma while the lyrics were penned by Papanasam Sivan. There were a total of 24 songs in Sakuntalai. A couple of songs  were longer than usual and the gramophone company had to issue special large sized records for them.

A partial list of songs in the film:

"Endhan Idadhu Tholum Kannum" – M. S. Subbulakshmi (Karaharapriya)
"Manamogananga Anangae" – M. S. Subbulakshmi, G. N. Balasubramaniam
"Premayil Yavum Marandenae" – M. S. Subbulakshmi, G. N. Balasubramaniam
"Engum Nirai Nadha Bramammae" – M. S. Subbulakshmi
"Vegudooram Kadal Thandi Povomae" – N. S. Krishnan, T. S. Durairaj
"Innaikku Kalaila Elundiruchu" – N. S. Krishnan, T. S. Durairaj
"Anandam En Solvaenae" – M. S. Subbulakshmi (Sindhu Bhairavi)
"Sugumara En Thabam" – M. S. Subbulakshmi (Behag)
"Pannedum Naalaai" – M. S. Subbulakshmi (NadhaNaamakriya)
"Manam Kulira, Ullam Kulira" – M. S. Subbulakshmi

Reception 
The film was released on 12 December 1940 and was a box office success.

References

External links 

 
 Photograph of Sadasivam, M. S. Subbulakshmi, Ellis R. Dungan during the shoot of Meera (1945)

1940 drama films
1940 films
1940s Tamil-language films
Films based on works by Kalidasa
Films directed by Ellis R. Dungan
Films scored by S. V. Venkatraman
Films set in ancient India
Indian black-and-white films
Indian drama films
Indian films based on plays
Works based on Shakuntala (play)